Russell Vernon Mack (June 13, 1891 – March 28, 1960)  served as a member of the United States House of Representatives representing Washington State's 3rd District from 1947 to 1960. He was born in 1891, in Hillman, Michigan. Mack moved to Aberdeen, Washington in 1895. Mack was educated at Stanford University in California, and then at the University of Washington in Seattle. Mack served as a corporal in the Thirty-ninth Field Artillery, Thirteenth Division, during World War I. Before serving in Congress, Mack worked in journalism in the Grays Harbor area, first at the Aberdeen Daily World from 1913 to 1934, then as the owner and publisher of the Hoquiam Daily Washingtonian from 1934 to 1950. Mack was the last Republican to serve the 3rd district, until Linda Smith was elected in 1994. Mack died on the floor of the U.S. House of Representatives on March 28, 1960, of cardiac arrest and has a scholarship named after him. Mack voted in favor of the Civil Rights Acts of 1957 and 1960.

See also
 List of United States Congress members who died in office (1950–99)

References

External links

1891 births
1960 deaths
United States Army personnel of World War I
American newspaper reporters and correspondents
Stanford University alumni
University of Washington alumni
United States Army officers
20th-century American newspaper publishers (people)
20th-century American politicians
People from Aberdeen, Washington
People from Hillman, Michigan
Republican Party members of the United States House of Representatives from Washington (state)
Military personnel from Michigan